A list of events from the year 1741 in France.

Incumbents
 Monarch – Louis XV

Events
The cavalry unit Régiment des Hussards de Saxe formed

Births

Full date missing
Antoine-François Callet, painter (died 1823)

Deaths

Full date missing
Jean-Baptiste Rousseau, poet and dramatist (born 1671)
Marie Anne de Bourbon, noblewoman (born 1697)
Gabriel-Vincent Thévenard, singer (born 1669)
Bernard de Montfaucon, monk and scholar (born 1655)
Henri Desmarets, composer (born 1661)
François Pourfour du Petit, anatomist (born 1664)
Françoise Prévost, ballerina (born c.1680)

See also

References

1740s in France